Severin is a surname. Notable people with the surname include:

 Arban Severin (born 1976), American composer, musician and film actress
 Carl Theodor Severin (1763–1836), German architect
 Dorothy Severin (born 1942), professor of literature and Hispanist
 Guy Severin (1926–2008), Russian scientist, engineer, inventor and producer of a number of aerospace life-rescue systems and space-suits
 Jacob Severin (1691–1753), Danish merchant who helped establish Ilulissat
 Jay Severin (1951–2020), American radio show host
 John Severin (1921–2012), American cartoonist
 Marie Severin (1929–2018), American cartoonist
 Mark Severin (1906–1987), British artist specialising in erotic art, especially bookplates
 Scott Severin (born 1979), Scottish football player for Dundee United
 Steven Severin (born 1955), British musician and composer, member of Siouxsie and the Banshees
 Tim Severin (1940-2020), British explorer and writer
 Toni Severin, New Zealand politician

Surnames of British Isles origin
Surnames of German origin
English-language surnames
German-language surnames
Surnames of English origin